Spainsat is a Spanish telecommunications satellite used for military and government communications. It allows telecommunications  the different missions of the Spanish Armed forces abroad by providing coverage on a wide area of the world ranging from the United States and South America to the Middle East, including Africa and Europe.

Overview
The satellite belongs to Hisdesat (Spanish company participated by Hispasat (43%), Ingeniería y Servicios Aeroespaciales (30%), Airbus (15%), Indra Espacio (7%) and Sener (5%)), and its initial investment was 415 million euros. It was built by Space Systems Loral in California United States, with an expected useful life of at least 15 years. Its takeoff mass was about 3,700 kilograms. It is instrumented with several transponders in the X band and one in the K military band. It is  situated on a geostationary orbit at 36,000 kilometres of altitude, 30 degrees west, over the Atlantic Ocean.

The satellite provides coverage to humanitarian, security and intelligence missions as well as to military operations, image transfers, embassy services and Spanish governmental communications.

Launch 
The satellite was launched on 11 March 2006 at 22:33 GMT from the Guiana Space Centre in Kourou, French Guiana, by an Ariane 5 ECA rocket of Arianespace.

External links 
 Web page of Hisdesat

Communications satellites in geostationary orbit
Satellites using the SSL 1300 bus
Satellites of Spain
2006 in Spain
Spacecraft launched in 2006